JoAnna Margaret Lund (September 4, 1944 – May 20, 2006) was the author of many books, including Healthy Exchanges Cookbook, HELP: Healthy Exchanges Lifetime Plan, and Make a Joyful Table.

Biography
JoAnna McAndrews was born in Davenport, Iowa, September 4, 1944, to Jerome McAndrews and Agnes Carrington. She graduated from high school in Lost Nation, Iowa and from the Western Illinois University.

In 1990, her son James, daughter Rebecca, and her son-in-law Matt, were all called into active duty during Operation Desert Storm. Plus, her son Tommy was in the U.S. Army Reserves. She reacted to the stress of the situation by overeating and by her mid-40s weighed 300 pounds. She began to think about her own mortality—and how her weight problem had created a life-threatening situation. She realized that diets had never helped her, and that if she reclaimed her health she could reclaim her life. In order to do so, she devised a method of "exchanges" to enable herself to eat all the food she loved while exchanging the fats and sugars with healthier choices. As friends asked for more and more of her recipes, she created her first cookbook, The Healthy Exchanges Cookbook.

Re-published by G. P. Putnam's Sons in 1993, it has since sold hundreds of thousands of copies. The cookbook proved to be only the beginning of Lund's career. The former self-proclaimed "diet queen" from DeWitt, Iowa authored several books and the founder of Healthy Exchanges, Inc., a company that publishes a monthly newsletter with a subscriber base of 15,000, motivational booklets and inspirational audio and video tapes.  According to People Magazine, the company is a $1 million enterprise that employs 30 people.

After starting her business, Lund became a nationally known spokeswoman for healthier eating. She was elected to represent Iowa at President Clinton's White House Council on Small Business in 1995. During that same year, the Governor of Iowa appointed her to serve on the Iowa Rural Health & Primary Care Commission. She hosted a weekly radio show on WOC Radio in DeWitt, Iowa and was featured in National publications such as The New York Times, People and Forbes. She has been interviewed on hundreds of regional television and radio shows, and is one of the top-selling cookbook authors on the television shopping channel, QVC Shopping network. During one hour-long appearance on QVC, she sold almost 200,000 books. In January 1997, she launched her own cooking show on PBS-TV, JoAnna Lund's HELP Yourself.

Lund was a member of the International Association of Culinary Professionals; Society for Nutrition Education; National Federation of Press Women; Association of Food Journalists; Mid-America Publishers Association; National Association of Independent Publishers; Publishers Marketing Association; and the International Association of Independent Publishers. She was a recipient of a Certificate of Nomination as Inc. Magazine's Entrepreneur of the Year from Iowa for 1993–95. She worked as a commercial insurance underwriter for 18 years before starting Healthy Exchanges.

Lund appeared on CNN and the Home Shopping Club and wrote numerous cookbooks. 

Lund sold the most books on QVC, up to the time of her death in May 2006.

Death and legacy
JoAnna Lund died of inflammatory breast cancer on May 20, 2006, aged 61. She had asked that Healthy Exchanges continue after her death through books and the newsletter. When she died, QVC even had a memorial flash screen remembering her the following weekend all day on the hour during the network broadcast.

References

1944 births
2006 deaths
American chefs
20th-century American women writers
Businesspeople in insurance
Deaths from cancer in Iowa
Deaths from breast cancer
People from Lost Nation, Iowa
Writers from Davenport, Iowa
People from DeWitt, Iowa
21st-century American women